Borzino is a rural locality (a village) in Posyolok Zolotkovo, Gus-Khrustalny District, Vladimir Oblast, Russia. The population was 19 as of 2010.

Geography 
Borzino is located on the Kopl River, 22 km east of Gus-Khrustalny (the district's administrative centre) by road. Novo-Novlyanovo is the nearest rural locality.

References 

Rural localities in Gus-Khrustalny District
Melenkovsky Uyezd